Juniperus brevifolia, the Azores juniper, is a species of juniper, endemic to the Azores (on Corvo, Faial, Flores, Pico, Santa Maria, São Jorge, São Miguel, and Terceira), where it occurs at altitudes of , rarely up to . It is closely related to Juniperus oxycedrus (prickly juniper) of the Mediterranean region and Juniperus cedrus (Canary Islands juniper) of the neighboring Macaronesian islands. It is threatened by habitat loss.

It is dioecious, with separate male and female plants. The seed cones are berry-like, green ripening in 18 months to orange-red with a variable pink waxy coating; they are spherical, 6–9 mm diameter, and have three or six fused scales in one or two whorls of three, the three larger scales each with a single seed. The seeds are dispersed when birds eat the cones, digesting the fleshy scales and passing the hard seeds in their droppings. The male cones are yellow, 2–3 mm long, and fall soon after shedding their pollen in early spring.

This is a vulnerable species in its native range due to a combination of historical felling for the valuable wood and competition from invasive introduced plants.

Habitat fragmentation 
On one of the Island Graciosa, Juniperus brevifolia has gone extinct, and on the other islands, it remains endangered. The decline in population is due to habitat fragmentations of its preferred habitat (laurel forest) caused by island colonization and grazing pressures.

References

brevifolia
Endemic flora of the Azores
Vulnerable plants
Taxonomy articles created by Polbot
Dioecious plants
Trees of mild maritime climate